Youngblood Hawke is a 1964 American drama film directed by Delmer Daves and starring James Franciscus, Suzanne Pleshette, and Geneviève Page. It was adapted from Herman Wouk's 1962 novel of the same name, which was loosely based on the life of Thomas Wolfe.

Plot
Youngblood Hawke is a Kentucky truck driver who moves to New York City with dreams of becoming a hot-shot writer. Almost immediately he meets editor Jeanne Green. She sees great promise in Hawke's writing and falls for the handsome Kentuckian while helping him put together his first book deal. His first novel is moderately successful, but is transformed into a Broadway play by a has-been stage actress. Jeanne discovers that Youngblood has an effect on a great many women, so she takes a job at a publishing company. Soon after, Hawke's second novel is heralded, and he becomes the toast of the town. He then has an affair with a married socialite. His third novel bombs and is panned by critics. Hawke's financial state declines, and he has to move back to Kentucky. While in Kentucky working on his next book, he contracts pneumonia and then realizes that Jeanne was his ideal woman.

Cast

Production
In September 1962, Warner Bros announced that Delmer Daves would write, produce and direct a feature film based on the novel. Daves previously made A Summer Place, Parrish, Susan Slade and Rome Adventure for the studio, all of which had starred Troy Donahue.

Daves spent time deciding which part of the novel he wanted to film. He decided to start with Hawke's rise while driving a truck and end with his recovery in hospital from a near death. The original script took six weeks to write. It was 140 pages in fine print, which would have run six to seven hours. He then cut the script after looking at various locations.

The lead role was offered to Warren Beatty, who demanded a fee of $200,000 plus script and cast approval. George Peppard, Stuart Whitman and Terence Stamp also were discussed.  James Franciscus was cast without even a screen test. (Daves saw him in The Outsider and the pilot for Mr Novak.) He signed in March 1963.

The female lead went to Suzanne Pleshette who made Rome Adventure with Daves.

Filming began on location in New York in April 1963.

See also
List of American films of 1964

References

External links 
 
 
 
 

1964 films
1964 drama films
Films based on works by Herman Wouk
Warner Bros. films
American drama films
American black-and-white films
1960s English-language films
Films scored by Max Steiner
Films about writers
Films based on American novels
Films set in Kentucky
Films set in New York City
1960s American films